is a constituency that represents Saga Prefecture in the House of Councillors in the Diet of Japan. Councillors are elected to the house by single non-transferable vote (SNTV) for six-year terms. Since the establishment of the current House of Councillors electoral system in 1947, the district has elected two Councillors, one each at elections held every three years. It has 679,289 registered voters as of September 2015.

Current Councillors 
The Councillors currently representing Saga are:
 Takamaro Fukuoka (Liberal Democratic Party (LDP)), elected to his first term in 2010, which will end in 2016. Previously served one term in the House of Representatives representing the Saga 1st district.
  (LDP); elected to his first term in 2013, which will end in 2019.

Elected Councillors

Election results

See also
List of districts of the House of Councillors of Japan
Saga Prefecture districts for the House of Representatives:
Saga 1st district
Saga 2nd district
Saga 3rd district

References 

Districts of the House of Councillors (Japan)